Dominic Fe'aunati (born 14 June 1978) is a Samoan former rugby league and rugby union footballer who last played for SC Albi, as a centre. He is a Samoa rugby union international.

Background
Fe'aunati was born in Wellington, New Zealand.

Career
Feaunati has previously played rugby league for St. Helens and Leigh Centurions in the Super League. He has also played for Pontypridd RFC, London Irish in the Guinness Premiership in 2005. Feaunati joined Worcester in January 2007 to add power and pace to the back line and is now firmly established as part of the first team squad. He then gained a contract in France with the Pro D2 club Béziers and has since moved on to Albi. Feaunati was also an NZ Junior Kiwis U15 in 1993 and represented the NZ U19 rugby union in 1997.

National career
Feaunati has already won seven caps for "his country" and played against England in the 2003 Rugby World Cup finals before switching codes to the league. Feaunati also played for  Barbarians against England in 2006 at Twickenham Stadium before joining Samoa in New Zealand for their NZ tour.

References

External links
Worcester Warriors profile
Saints Heritage Society profile
Rugby League Project stats

1978 births
Expatriate rugby union players in England
Expatriate rugby union players in Italy
Expatriate rugby union players in Wales
Leigh Leopards players
Living people
New Zealand expatriate rugby union players
New Zealand expatriate sportspeople in England
New Zealand expatriate sportspeople in Italy
New Zealand expatriate sportspeople in Wales
New Zealand sportspeople of Samoan descent
New Zealand rugby league players
Pontypridd RFC players
Rugby articles needing expert attention
Rugby union players from Wellington City
Samoa international rugby union players
Worcester Warriors players
St Helens R.F.C. players